UFC 146: dos Santos vs. Mir was a mixed martial arts (MMA) pay-per-view event (PPV) promoted by the Ultimate Fighting Championship (UFC) on May 26, 2012 at the MGM Grand Garden Arena in Las Vegas, Nevada. The main card featured five MMA bouts which were shown on PPV, as well as seven preliminary bouts which were shown on FX, and Facebook. This was the first time in UFC history that the main card featured all heavyweight bouts. It was the twelfth UFC event of 2012.

The main event featured the UFC Heavyweight Champion, Junior dos Santos, defending his title against former two-time UFC Heavyweight Champion Frank Mir. The contest was heavily promoted, featuring the return of UFC Primetime to promote the UFC Heavyweight Championship. The co-main event of the evening was a battle between former heavyweight champion Cain Velasquez, and newly acquired Strikeforce heavyweight, Antônio Silva, who made his UFC debut.

Background
Frank Mir was riding a three fight win streak leading up to this event, including a submission victory over Antônio Rodrigo Nogueira, a friend and mentor of Junior dos Santos, at UFC 140. Nogueira refused to tap to the kimura lock submission attempt, until it broke after his arm snapped under the pressure, then he tapped. Not only was Mir the first fighter to ever submit Nogueira, but he did so in devastating fashion. This was the first title defense for dos Santos since winning the belt by knocking out Cain Velasquez in November 2011 at UFC on Fox: Velasquez vs. Dos Santos.

UFC Primetime returned to promote the UFC Heavyweight Championship between Mir and dos Santos. The heavyweight championship at UFC 146 was the featured fight on the main card, which for the first time in UFC history had all heavyweight bouts.

Evan Dunham was expected to face Edson Barboza at the event. However, Dunham was forced from the event with an injury and replaced by returning veteran Jamie Varner.

Mark Hunt was originally scheduled to face Stefan Struve on the main card. However, on May 17, 2012, Hunt withdrew from the bout due to injury and was replaced by Lavar Johnson.

Alistair Overeem removal and card changes
Originally scheduled to headline the event was a Heavyweight Championship bout between one of UFC's newest stars, Alistair Overeem (who defeated former champion Brock Lesnar in his UFC debut to earn the title shot), and champion Junior dos Santos. On April 4, 2012, however, the Nevada State Athletic Commission (NSAC) announced Overeem had failed his pre-fight drug test. Overeem's March drug test showed a 14:1 testosterone-epitestosterone ratio, according to the NSAC.

This resulted in a considerable shake up of the matches on the main card. On April 20, 2012, UFC President Dana White announced that Junior dos Santos would now defend his title against Frank Mir instead. Two days later, White announced Cain Velasquez (who was originally slated to fight Mir in the co-main event) would face Antônio Silva. Roy Nelson (who was originally scheduled to fight Silva, and then briefly Gabriel Gonzaga) faced Dave Herman. And Shane del Rosario (who was originally slated to fight Gonzaga) faced Stipe Miocic.

Results

Bonus awards
Fighters were awarded $70,000 bonuses.
 Fight of the Night: None Awarded
 Knockout of the Night:  Roy Nelson and  Dan Hardy Submission of the Night:  Stefan Struve and  Paul SassReported payout
The following is the reported payout to the fighters as reported to the Nevada State Athletic Commission. It does not include sponsor money and also does not include the UFC's traditional "fight night" bonuses.
 Junior dos Santos: $200,000 (no win bonus) def. Frank Mir: $200,000
 Cain Velasquez: $200,000 (includes $100,000 win bonus) def. Antonio Silva: $70,000
 Roy Nelson: $40,000 (includes $20,000 win bonus) def. Dave Herman: $21,000
 Stipe Miocic: $20,000 (includes $10,000 win bonus) def. Shane del Rosario: $20,000
 Stefan Struve: $58,000 (includes $29,000 win bonus) def. Lavar Johnson: $26,000
 Darren Elkins: $28,000 (includes $14,000 win bonus) def. Diego Brandao: $15,000
 Jamie Varner: $20,000 (includes $10,000 win bonus) def. Edson Barboza: $18,000
 C.B. Dollaway: $40,000 (includes $20,000 win bonus) def. Jason Miller: $45,000
 Dan Hardy: $50,000 (includes $25,000 win bonus) def. Duane Ludwig: $18,000
 Paul Sass: $20,000 (includes $10,000 win bonus) def. Jacob Volkmann: $20,000
 Glover Teixeira: $30,000 (includes $15,000 win bonus) def. Kyle Kingsbury: $12,000
 Mike Brown: $52,000 (includes $26,000 win bonus) def. Daniel Pineda:''' $10,000

See also
List of UFC events
2012 in UFC

References

External links
 UFC 146 official website

Ultimate Fighting Championship events
2012 in mixed martial arts
Mixed martial arts in Las Vegas
2012 in sports in Nevada
MGM Grand Garden Arena